Benjamin Morris may refer to:
 Benjamin Wistar Morris (colonist) (1762–1825), founder of Wellsboro, Pennsylvania
 Benjamin Wistar Morris (bishop) (1819–1906), second Bishop of the Episcopal Diocese of Oregon
 Benjamin Wistar Morris (architect) (1870–1944), American architect from Oregon who worked primarily in New York City
 Benny Morris, Israeli professor
 Ben Morris (special effects artist), special effects artist
 Ben Morris (footballer), English footballer
 Ben Morris (rugby league), Wales rugby league international